The Delaware Transit Corporation, operating as DART First State, is the only public transportation system that operates throughout the U.S. state of Delaware. DART First State provides local and inter-county bus service throughout the state and also subsidizes commuter rail service along SEPTA Regional Rail's Wilmington/Newark Line serving the northern part of the state. The agency also operates statewide paratransit service for people with disabilities. DART First State is a subsidiary of the Delaware Department of Transportation (DelDOT).

Although most of its bus routes run in and around Wilmington and Newark in New Castle County, DART operates bus route networks in the Dover area of Kent County; seven year-round bus routes serving Georgetown and Sussex County; and additional seasonal routes connecting Rehoboth Beach, other beach towns in Sussex County, and Ocean City, Maryland.

DART was awarded the prestigious Public Transportation System Outstanding Achievement Award by the American Public Transportation Association in 2003.

History 

DART First State traces its origins back to June 30, 1864, when the Wilmington City Railroad Company began trolley service powered by horses and mules along city streets in Wilmington. The Wilmington City Railroad Company introduced electric trolley service in 1888, the first such service in Delaware. Motor buses were first introduced in 1925. The electric trolleys were replaced with trackless electric trolleys in 1938. Bus service operated by Delaware Coach Company replaced the trackless electric trolleys in 1958 and would operate for over a decade. Delaware was also served by several private bus operators. Among these was Short Line, which provided seasonal service to Rehoboth Beach along with service to Oxford, Kennett Square, and West Chester in Pennsylvania. These private bus services were discontinued in the early 1960s.

The Delaware General Assembly created the Delaware Authority for Regional Transit (DART) in 1969 to take over bus service in the Wilmington area from the Delaware Coach Company. DART bus service originally operated under the Greater Wilmington Transportation Authority, but in 1971 the Delaware Department of Transportation (DelDOT) became the governing agency of DART. The Delaware Transit Authority oversaw the Central Delaware Transit (CDT) bus service in the Dover area and the Resort Transit bus service at the Delaware Beaches, which both began in 1990.

In 1994, the Delaware Transit Corporation (DTC) was created by the Delaware General Assembly to manage and operate DART, the Delaware Administration for Specialized Transportation, the Delaware Railroad Administration, and the Commuter Services Administration. DTC operates DART First State bus service throughout the state along with contracting with SEPTA Regional Rail to provide commuter rail service along the Wilmington/Newark Line in New Castle County.

DART First State was named "Most Outstanding Public Transportation System" in 2003 by the American Public Transportation Association.

In 2016, DART First State received a $2 million grant from the Federal Transit Administration (FTA) for six battery electric buses to be used in the Dover area. In 2017, the agency received a $1 million grant from the FTA for ten battery electric buses, eight of which would be used in New Castle County while the other two would be used in Sussex County. The FTA gave DART First State a $2.6 million grant to purchase more electric buses in 2019. DART First State's fleet of battery electric buses are manufactured by Proterra, Inc.

Fixed-route bus service

New Castle County 

DART First State operates 34 fixed route bus routes throughout New Castle County, serving Wilmington, Newark, New Castle, and Middletown. The majority of the routes hub in downtown Wilmington, with many of those routes serving the Wilmington Transit Center adjacent to the Wilmington train station.  Other major bus hubs in New Castle County include Newark Transit Hub in Newark and the Christiana Mall Park & Ride at the Christiana Mall.  Most routes operate Monday through Saturday with some Sunday service. These routes have 1- and 2-digit numbers. All except 3 of these routes are directly operated by DART First State; the remaining 3 routes (Rts. 61, 62 & 64) are operated by third-party contractors.

Kent County 

DART First State operates 10 fixed route bus routes within the Dover area in Kent County serving points within Dover along with other communities in Kent County including Camden, Wyoming, Felton, Harrington, and Smyrna. These bus routes operate Monday through Friday with some Saturday service out of the Dover Transit Center in downtown Dover as a hub-and-spoke system.  These routes are numbered in the 100-series. In addition to the fixed-route service, GoLink Flex bus service formerly provided service from points within the Dover area to a free transfer to a fixed route. This service was available on weekdays through advance reservations. GoLink Flex bus service was discontinued in May 2017 due to low usage.

Sussex County 

DART First State operates a total of 9 bus routes within Sussex County.  Seven of these routes offer year-round fixed route bus service within Sussex County, serving Georgetown, Lewes, Rehoboth Beach, Millsboro, Bridgeville, Seaford, Laurel, Delmar, and Milford. These bus routes operate Monday through Friday with some Saturday service. During the summer months, DART operates 6 seasonal bus routes, including expanded service on 4 of the year-round routes, branded as "Beach Bus" which hub at the Rehoboth Beach Park and Ride and Lewes Transit Center park and ride lots and offer connecting service to coastal communities along the Delaware Beaches and to Ocean City, Maryland daily from May to September. These routes are numbered in the 200-series. One of the year-round routes serving Seaford is a "Flex Route", where passengers can make reservations for the bus to pick them up within a mile off the fixed route and also flag the bus at any location in designated Flag Zones; this route is numbered as Route 903F. Bus service in Sussex County is operated under contract by First Transit.

Intercounty Service 

DART First State operates four intercounty bus routes which connect the three separate systems.  Route 301 operates weekday and limited Saturday service between Downtown Wilmington, Christiana Mall, Middletown, Smyrna, and Dover and Route 302 operates weekday service between Newark and Dover via Glasgow, Middletown, Townsend, and Smyrna, connecting the New Castle and Kent Counties fixed route systems.  Route 303 operates weekday service between Dover and Georgetown and Route 307 operates weekday service between Dover and Lewes, connecting the Kent and Sussex Counties fixed route systems. During the summer months, DART First State operates Route 305 "Beach Connection" on weekends and holidays, connecting Wilmington, Christiana Mall, Middletown, and Dover with Lewes and Rehoboth Beach from Memorial Day weekend to Labor Day weekend. DART First State directly operates all these routes except Route 303, which is operated under contract by First Transit.

DART Connect 
DART Connect is a microtransit service operated by DART First State in the Georgetown and Millsboro areas in Sussex County. The service operates similar to a rideshare and provides on-demand service using minibuses, as opposed to a traditional bus service that follows a published schedule. Rides can be booked using the DART Connect app or over the phone. Fares are the same as traditional bus service. DART Connect service is offered Monday-Friday year-round. DART Connect service began on April 12, 2021, replacing Flex Routes 901F and 902F.

Paratransit service 
DART First State offers paratransit service for people with disabilities who are unable to use fixed-route bus service in accordance with the Americans with Disabilities Act (ADA). Paratransit trips that begin and end within  of fixed-route bus service when such service operates are considered ADA Paratransit trips while all other trips are considered non-ADA Demand Response trips.

Rail service 

DART First State, through DelDOT, subsidizes the segment of the Wilmington/Newark Line of SEPTA Regional Rail within the state of Delaware.  SEPTA operates the service under contract with DART First State. Signage at the Delaware stations differs from that at other SEPTA Regional Rail stations, as the stations are owned by DART First State and not SEPTA. These trains originate in Philadelphia and operate to Wilmington station in Wilmington, with an intermediate stop at Claymont station.  A few rush-hour trains continue on to Newark station in Newark, with an intermediate stop at Churchmans Crossing station, located near the Delaware Park horse racing track and casino. SEPTA service in Delaware consists of 41 trains on weekdays, 8 trains on Saturdays, and 7 trains on Sundays.

Park and ride lots 
There are 37 park and ride lots located throughout the state of Delaware, primarily in New Castle County, that allow motorists to park and transfer to DART First State buses or meet a carpool. There are also 12 park and pool lots in the state where motorists can park and meet a carpool.

Fares 
Most DART First State bus routes have a base fare of $2 per zone as of February 2021. Routes 61 and 62 have a base fare of $1. Cash fares must be paid in exact change. DART First State bus fares may also be paid with DART Pass, a mobile payment option available through the DART Transit app on smartphones. A reduced fare of $0.80 per zone is available for senior citizens and disabled persons. Kids below 46" (limit 3 per adult) and the blind ride for free. A student fare of $1 per zone is available (cash only), with a student ID required for students age 17 and older. DART First State does not issue transfers. DART First State offers a Daily Pass for $4 per zone, a 7-day pass for $16 per zone, a 30-day pass for $60 per zone, and a 20-ride pass (DART Pass only) for $26 per zone. DART First State has three fare zones which correspond with the three counties of Delaware.

The fare for ADA Paratransit trips is $4 while the fare for non-ADA Demand Response Trips is $6. A County Connector fee of $4 is charged on paratransit trips that cross into another county. Paratransit fares must be paid in cash with exact change or with paratransit strip tickets.  DART First State offers $2 paratransit strip tickets available as a strip of 6 tickets for $12.

Until February 2021, DART First State offered a stored value card called DARTCard that could be used to pay for single-ride bus fares or a Daily Pass. DARTCards were available in six denominations (Gold, Blue, Yellow, Green, Purple, and Platinum) ranging from $9.60 to $65 for regular fares along with a $14 Red DARTCard for reduced fares for senior citizens and disabled persons. DARTCards provided a discount off the regular fare, with the discount increasing the more expensive the card is. For example, the Gold DARTCard cost $9.60 and had a value of $12 for a 20% discount; while the Platinum DARTCard cost $65 and had a value of $108.00 for a 40% discount. The reduced fare DARTCard cost $14 and had a value of $46 for a 70% discount. DARTCards were not rechargeable and a new one must be purchased once the value is used up. DARTCards were available from DART First State by purchasing over the phone, by mail, or online; they were also available at select retailers across the state. Weekly or Monthly SEPTA TrailPasses on a SEPTA Key card were formerly allowed to be used on buses in northern New Castle County. Starting January 1, 2021, SEPTA Key cards were no longer accepted on DART First State buses because the fareboxes cannot read the card to confirm the purchase of a TrailPass and due to widespread fraudulent use.

Fleet 
DART First State's bus fleet consists of 247 fixed-route buses and 294 paratransit buses. The agency also owns 4 rail cars used by SEPTA. The bus fleet consists mostly of Gillig Low Floor diesel and hybrid buses used for local service and MCI D4500CT diesel buses used for inter-county service. DART First State also has Proterra Catalyst battery electric buses manufactured by Proterra. The SEPTA rail cars owned by the state of Delaware are Silverliner V 735, 736, 871, and 872.

Public engagement initiatives 
On April 7, 2018, DART First State's parent agency DelDOT along with DNREC started a month long hackathon to make Delaware "the most accessible state" by finding ways to improve transportation access to recreational areas in the state.

See also 
Delaware Department of Transportation
RideShare Delaware
Paratransit

References

External links 

DART First State
DART Routes and Schedules
SEPTA – Southeastern Pennsylvania Transportation Authority

 
Organizations established in 1994
Bus transportation in Delaware
Passenger rail transportation in Delaware
Transit agencies in Delaware
1994 establishments in Delaware